Foster Hendrickson Benjamin (1895–1936) was an American entomologist and lepidopterist.

Biography
Benjamin was born in 1895, and was friends with George P. Engelhardt and Jacob Doll, who introduced him to entomology. In 1921 he graduated from Cornell University, and got a job from Mississippi State Plant Board. He became a curator of William Barnes Museum in 1922 at Decatur, Illinois, and by 1927 became a member of the United States Department of Agriculture and Bureau of Entomology. He was an assistant in investigations of the Mexican and Mediterranean fruit flies, that he found in Texas in 1927, and in Florida, 1929. He became a member of the Bureau of Entomology, a division of United States National Museum, where he remained until his death in 1936.

References

American lepidopterists
1895 births
1936 deaths
Cornell University College of Agriculture and Life Sciences alumni
American curators
Date of birth missing
Date of death missing
20th-century American zoologists